IPGMER and SSKM Hospital, or in its full name Institute of Post-Graduate Medical Education and Research and Seth Sukhlal Karnani Memorial Hospital, colloquially known as P.G. Hospital (Presidency General Hospital), also known as PGI Kolkata, is a Public hospital and Medical school and tertiary referral government hospital for the state of West Bengal, India and is a national research institute.

Located near Race Course ground and the Victoria Memorial Hall of Kolkata, its location is in the heart of Kolkata surrounded by cultural and historical landmarks like the Nandan complex, Rabindra Sadan, Academy of Fine Arts the Saint Paul's Cathedral, the Red Road and the Indian Museum. It faces the Maidan of Kolkata - a hot-spot for political rallies in the city. The Bangur Institute of Neurosciences is adjacent and functionally attached to this institution.

History 
The first hospital in Calcutta was built in the premises of the Old Fort at Gerstein Place in 1707. The Council of Fort William constructed this hospital. Initially built for the Europeans till 1770, this hospital was then known as the Presidency Hospital, after the Presidency of Calcutta and due to its proximity to the Presidency Jail of Calcutta. Later it came to be known as the Presidency General Hospital or P.G. Hospital for short - the name which is still commonly used. In independent India, the hospital was renamed as Seth Sukhlal Karnani Memorial Hospital in 1954 after great philanthropist of Calcutta, Sukhlal Karnani.

P.G. Hospital was established in 1707. The East India Company (Calcutta Council) purchased the plot of land, which was a gardenhouse (in 1768) from Rev. John Zacharias Kiernander at a cost of Rs. 98900.00 along with an adjoining plot belonging to a Bengali gentleman.

Rev. John Zacharias Kiernander came to Bengal from Southern India in 1758 to work as the first Protestant missionary in Calcutta. The well known Old Mission Church (Bath Tephillah -'the House of Prayer'), built by him was the earliest favourite place of Protestant worship in Mission Row at his own expense at a cost of Rs. 65,000 and established a mission school in the rear of the Church in 1767. The Presidency General Hospital was established near the St. John's Church (presently, in 1, Garstin Place and in its adjoining areas) which was in famous as a hellish side.

According to Mrs. Bleshinden, "It was a veritable death-trap to those unfortunate who were driven to seek its shelter and had been the subject of constant complaint for years. At last in 1768. a house was purchased from a native gentleman for the purpose of a hospital. It stood to the south of the Maidan, practically in the country. This house with various alterations and additions, including two other buildings created in 1795 remained in us as the Presidency General Hospital".

The construction of the hospital started after the Government occupied the land on 20 June 1769. The west wing was completed on 2 April 1770 and the east wing on 2 June 1770. Admission of the patients started on 22 April 1770.

The present Main Block was constructed between 1901 and 1902, the Woodburn Block, Administrative Building and Physiotherapy Building were built between 1902 and 1908. For construction of Woodburn block, total expense was Rs. 3.5 Lacs.

This hospital is the oldest general hospital in India, for the practice of modern medicine and for meaningful research.

It is mentioned in the book "The handbook of travellers in India, Pakistan, Nepal, Bangladesh & Sri Lanka" by L. F. Rushbrook Williams that, "On the Lower Circular Road, South of Victoria Memorial is the Presidency General Hospital (1768), formerly intended for Europeans. In its place The European business community has established a well found clinic of his own. The Station military hospital, conspicuous by its pillared frontage was (1773) the court house of Sardar Dewani Adalat, the Chief Provincial Court of Appeal which ceased to exist on the establishment of High Court in 1862". From this record, it is quite evident that PG Hospital is a part, of world heritage, I am thankful to Calcutta Municipal Corporation and the Govt. of West. Bengal for declaring heritage status to this institution in response to my appeal dated 16.1.1998.

Sir Ronald Ross made his epoch-making-discovery of "Cycle of Malarial Parasite" in this hospital and was awarded Nobel Prize in Medicine and Physiology on 10 Dec 1902. He also received the Barkley Bronze Memorial Medal from Asiatic Society, Calcutta on 20 May 1903, Sir Ronald Ross is the first Indian (born at Almorah) Nobel laureate. After his retirement from service on 31 July 1899, he visited PG Hospital in January 1927, when the "Gate of Commemoration" bearing his statue and poem in the plaque was unveiled by Lord Lytton.

Michael Madhusudan Dutta was the first native Indian to be admitted to this hospital on 22 June 1873 and here he died on 29 June 1873.

Dr. Surendranath Ghosh was the first native Indian doctor to be appointed in PG Hospital. The first floor of the Woodburn Block was renamed as Dr. S. N. Ghosh Ward, by the then Chief minister Hon'ble Jyoti Basu following the publication of the article in PG Bulletin, along with a photograph of Dr. Ghosh and facsimile of his diary page. The first Indian doctor of the hospital has been bestowed with honour.

 
P.G. Hospital was the first Post Graduate Medical Institute in Eastern India in 1957 when it hospital came to be known as The Institute of Post Graduate Medical Education & Research (IPGMER). It was inaugurated by Pandit Jawahar Lal Nehru, the then Prime Minister of India, on 16 January 1957.

Undergraduate medical training started here rather late in 2004 after clearance from the Medical Council Of India (MCI).

The erstwhile Chief minister, Hon'ble Jyoti Basu had pledged his body to the advancement of medical science. After his demise, honoring his wishes, his body was handed over to the college authorities. This move has triggered a wave of body donations in the state.

On 2015 Medical Council of India has threatened to scrap the DM-Neonatology course due to lack of qualified faculty members for teaching the subject.

On 2015 an influential Trinamool Congress leader & State Medical Council President Dr. Nirmal Maji's request, Dr Pradip Kumar Mitra, a former director of IPGMER Kolkata agreed to perform hemo-dialysis on the pet dog. Later he was removed from the post. In May 2019 Ethics Committee of the Medical Council of India (MCI) recently reprimanded the three doctors involved. The three doctors in question included Dr Nirmal Majhi, President West Bengal Medical Council, Dr Pradip Kumar Mitra, the then Director, SSKM Hospital and Dr Rajendra Pandey, HOD Nephrology Department at the hospital.

West Bengal's 1st free IVF unit to come up at SSKM

Rankings

IPGMER ranked 21 in medical Section in India in 2022 by National Institutional Ranking Framework.

Layout 
One end of the premises contains various outpatient departments, wards and clinics, while the other comprises the administrative and college buildings for medical and paramedical students.
The wards include Curzon, Victoria, Alexander, etc. in the Main block, the O&G blocks. Other services are the out patient departments and wards of Chest, Cancer, Nephrology, etc.
The teaching buildings include the UCM, Ronald Ross, Psychiatry building, Old Emergency Building, housing lecture theaters, museums and laboratories.

Academic building is in the  heart of hospital campus. It was established in 2014.

The medical college Library is situated in the seventh floor. There are two separate sections of library for the UG and PG students.

HOSTEL FACILITY:
 
There are three hostels for undergraduates and one hostel for postgraduate  students, all inside the college campus.
 
There are separate boys' and girls' hostels. A newly constructed boys hostel named NEW MBBS BOYS HOSTEL is inside the PG campus and one UG hostel named MAIN HOSTEL is inside the college campus. A newly constructed UG girls' hostel is adjacent to the Academic building .
                                 
The cultural fest of IPGME&R and SSKM Hospital is CRUX which is held annually around August–September.

Organisation and administration 

It is currently affiliated to the West Bengal University of Health Sciences. From 1857 to 2003, it was affiliated with the historic University of Calcutta. It is funded and run jointly by the state and central governments of India.

:
Director: Prof Manimoy Banerjee, MBBS, MS (Anatomy)
MSVP: Prof. (Dr.) Pijush Kumar Roy, MBBS, MD (Otorhinolaryngology)
Dean of Student Affairs: Prof. Abhijit Hazra, MBBS, MD (Pharmacology)
Deputy Superintendent: Dr. Amit Majumdar  
 Head of Department- Internal Medicine: Prof. Soumitro Ghosh
Head of Department- Obstetrics and Gynecology: Prof. P.S. Chakraborti
Head of Department- Cardiology: Prof. D. Mukherjee
Head of Department- Neurology: Prof. G. Ganguly
Head of Department- Endocrinology: Prof. Subhankar Chowdhury
Head of Department- General Surgery: Prof. Makhan Lal Saha
Head of Department - Surgical Gastroenterology: Prof. Sukanta Ray

Campus 
On 2019 Chief Minister Mamata Banerjee inaugurated a 244-bed level-1 trauma care centre at SSKM Hospital. It has been built on the lines of a unit at AIIMS, New Delhi, to cater to trauma patients.

Medical units 
 Institute of Psychiatry
 Bangur Institute of Neurosciences
 Sambhunath Pandit Hospital
 Ramrik Hospital
 PG Polyclinic
 Khiddirpore Maternity Home
 Kolkata Police Hospital

Departments 

Anaesthesiology
Anatomy
Biochemistry
Cardiovascular Sciences (Cardiac Division)	
Cardiovascular Sciences (Cardiothoracic & Vascular Surgery)
Dentistry
Dermatology
Emergency
Endocrinology
ENT/Oto-Rhino-Laryngology
Forensic Medicine
Gastroenterology
Medicine
Microbiology
Neonatology
Nephrology
Neuro-anaesthesiology
Neuromedicine
Neurosurgery
Nuclear & Experimental Medical Sciences
Obstetrics & Gynaecology
Ophthalmology
Orthopaedic Surgery
Pathology
Paediatric Medicine
Paediatric Surgery
Pharmacology
Physical Medicine and Rehabilitation
Physiology
Plastic Surgery
Preventive and Social Medicine
Psychiatry
Radiodiagnosis
Radiotherapy
Respiratory Medicine
Surgery
Surgical Gastroenterology
Urology
Rheumatology and Clinical Immunology

Achievements 
On Oct 2021 Government of West Bengal declared as 'Centre of Excellence' in Medical Education and Research in the State. In December 2021, Department by Surgical Gastroenterology lead by Dr Abhijit Chowdhury, Dr.Sukanta Ray, Dr. Somak Das and Dr Tuhin Subhra Mandal conducted a liver transplant with its own team of doctors for the first time since the state-run hospital began liver transplant in 2009.

From 19 April 2022 West Bengal's first fertility centre in a government hospital has started functioning at IPGMER. The centre of excellence in reproductive medicine opened its doors to outdoor patients.

See also 
Medical College Kolkata
Calcutta National Medical College
All India Institute of Medical Sciences
National Institute of Cholera and Enteric Diseases
Nil Ratan Sarkar Medical College and Hospital
Calcutta School of Tropical Medicine

References

External links 
 

1707 establishments in the British Empire
Affiliates of West Bengal University of Health Sciences
Buildings and structures completed in 1770
Hospital buildings completed in the 18th century
Hospital buildings completed in 1908
Hospitals in Kolkata
Hospitals in West Bengal
Medical colleges in West Bengal
Medical research institutes in India
1707 establishments in India
20th-century architecture in India